The women's tournament of basketball at the 2015 Summer Universiade in Gwangju began on July 5 and end on July 13.

Teams

Preliminary round

Group A

|}

Group B

|}

Group C

|}

Group D

|}

Classification round

Quarter-final round

9th–16th place

Semi-final round

13th–16th place

9th–12th place

5th–8th place

Final round

15th place game

13th place game

11th place game

9th place game

7th place game

5th place game

Elimination round

Quarter-finals

Semi-finals

Bronze Medal Game

Gold Medal Game

Final standings

References

2015
Basketball - Women's
2015 in women's basketball
Women's
International women's basketball competitions hosted by South Korea
2015 in South Korean women's sport